Adventures in Clubland is the debut album by English band Modern Romance. It was released in 1981 on LP and Cassette tape by WEA, and in 2008 a CD reissue was released by Wounded Bird Records.

Track listing
All tracks written by Geoff Deane and David Jaymes, except where stated.
"Bring on the Funkateers" – 4:09 (Geoff Deane, David Jaymes, Paul Gendler)
"Nothing Ever Goes the Way You Plan/Queen of the Rapping Scene" – 5:47
Clubland Mix – 11:36 (Geoff Deane, David Jaymes, Paul Gendler)
"Everybody Salsa" (Geoff Deane, David Jaymes)
"Moose on the Loose"
"Salsa Rapp-Sody"
"Ay Ay Ay Ay Moosey" (Geoff Deane, David Jaymes)
"We've Got Them Running (The Counting Song)" – 3:41
"Can You Move" – 8:28
"I Can't Get Enough" – 4:20
"Stand Up" – 5:52

Chart Position
Venezuela #1 [Certified Gold]

Personnel
Geoff Deane – vocals
Paul Gendler – guitar
David Jaymes – bass guitar
Robbie Jaymes – synthesizer
Andy Kyriacou – drums
John Du Prez – trumpet
Michael J. Mullins – backing vocalist, guitar [Credited on Sleeve]

Singles
Everybody Salsa (1981) UK #12
Ay Ay Ay Ay Moosey (1981) UK #10
Queen of the Rapping Scene / Nothing Ever Goes the Way You Plan (1982) UK #37

References

1981 debut albums
Modern Romance (band) albums